Charles Dobzynski (born 1929 Warsaw - 26 September 2014) was a French poet, journalist and translator.

Life
His family emigrated to France, where he was barely a year old. He narrowly escaped deportation during World War II. he published his first poem in 1944, in a youth newspaper of the Resistance. In 1949, Paul Eluard presented his first poems in Les Lettres françaises. On the proposal of Aragon, he entered the newspaper's editors Ce Soir.  He was a journalist and film critic.  He was an editor of the magazine Europe, with Pierre Abraham, and Pierre Gamarra.

He is Chevalier of Arts and Letters, a member of the Académie Mallarmé, and president of the jury for the Apollinaire prize.

Awards
 2005 Prix Goncourt de la Poésie

Works

English Translations

Bibliography
 Notre amour est pour demain - Seghers, 1951
 Au clair de l’amour - Seghers, 1955
 D’une voix commune - Seghers, 1962
 L’Opéra de l’espace - Gallimard, 1963
 Capital terrestre - E.F.R.
 Un Cantique pour Massada - Europe poésie, 1976
 Arbre d’identité, Rougerie, 1976
 Callifictions - 1977
 Table des éléments - Belfond, 1978
 Délogiques - Belfond, 1981
 Une vie de ventrilogue - 1981
 40 polars en miniature - Rougerie 1983
 Liturgie profane - Le Verbe et l'empreinte 1983
 La vie est un orchestre - Belfond, 1988, Prix Max Jacob 1992
 Alphabase Rougerie, 1992
 Fable chine - Rougerie, 1996
 Géode - éd. Phi, 1998

 Journal alternatif, Bernard Dumerchez, 2000
 Les Heures de Moscou - Europe/Poésie
 L'Escalier des Questions - L'Amourier, 2003
 Corps à réinventer - éd. de la Différence, 2005
 La Réalité d'à côté - éd. L'Amourier, 2005
 La Scène primitive, novel - éd. de La Différence, 2006
 A revoir, la mémoire - éd. Phi 2006
 Gestuaire des sports - éd. Le Temps des cerises, 2006

References

External links
Author's blog"

1929 births
2014 deaths
Prix Goncourt de la Poésie winners
Polish emigrants to France
French male poets
20th-century French poets
20th-century French male writers